The Municipality of Žalec is a municipality in Slovenia in the traditional region of Styria. The seat of the municipality is the town of Žalec. The municipality was established in its current form on 7 August 1998, when the former larger municipality of Žalec was divided into six smaller municipalities.

Settlements

In addition to the municipal seat of Žalec, the municipality also includes the following settlements:

 Arja Vas
 Brnica
 Dobriša Vas
 Drešinja Vas
 Galicija
 Gotovlje
 Grče
 Griže
 Hramše
 Kale
 Kasaze
 Levec
 Liboje
 Ložnica pri Žalcu
 Mala Pirešica
 Migojnice
 Novo Celje
 Pernovo
 Petrovče
 Podkraj
 Podlog v Savinjski Dolini
 Podvin
 Pongrac
 Ponikva pri Žalcu
 Ruše
 Šempeter v Savinjski Dolini
 Spodnje Grušovlje
 Spodnje Roje
 Studence
 Velika Pirešica
 Vrbje
 Zabukovica
 Zalog pri Šempetru
 Zaloška Gorica
 Zavrh pri Galiciji
 Železno
 Zgornje Grušovlje
 Zgornje Roje

References

External links
 Municipality of Žalec website
 

 
1998 establishments in Slovenia
Zalec